StrataCom, Inc. was a supplier of Asynchronous Transfer Mode (ATM) and Frame Relay high-speed wide area network (WAN) switching equipment. StrataCom was founded in Cupertino, California, United States, in January 1986, by 26 former employees of the failing Packet Technologies, Inc.  StrataCom produced the first commercial cell switch, also known as a fast-packet switch.  ATM was one of the technologies underlying the world's communications systems in the 1990s.

Origins of the IPX at Packet Technologies
Internet pioneer Paul Baran was an employee of Packet Technologies and provided a spark of invention at the initiation of the Integrated Packet Exchange (IPX) project (StrataCom's IPX communication system is unrelated to Novell's IPX Internetwork Packet Exchange protocol).

The IPX was initially known as the PacketDAX, which was a play on words of Digital access and cross-connect system (or DACS).  A rich collection of inventions were contained in the IPX, and many were provided by the other members of the development team.  The names on the original three IPX patents are Paul Baran, Charles Corbalis, Brian Holden, Jim Marggraff, Jon Masatsugu, David Owen and Pete Stonebridge.  StrataCom's implementation of ATM was pre-standard and used 24 byte cells instead of standards-based ATM's 53 byte cells.  However, many of concepts and details found in the ATM set of standards were derived directly from StrataCom's technology, including the use of CRC-based framing on its links.

The IPX development
The IPX's first use was as a 4-1 voice compression system.  It implemented Voice-Activity-Detection (VAD) and ADPCM, which together, gave 4-1 compression allowing 96 telephone calls to be fit into the space of 24.  The IPX was also used as an enterprise voice-data networking system as well as a global enterprise networking system. McGraw-Hill's Data communications Magazine included the IPX in its list of "20 Most Significant Communications Products of the Last 20 Years" in a 1992 edition.

The Beta test of the IPX was in Michigan Bell between Livonia, Plymouth, and Northville, 3 suburbs of Detroit.  The first customer shipment was to the May Company between department stores in San Diego and Los Angeles.  The most significant early use of the IPX was as the backbone of the Covia/United Airlines flight reservation system.  It also was used in multiple corporate networks including those of CompuServe, Intel and Hewlett-Packard.  The IPX's most successful use was as the first Frame Relay networking product.  It formed the core of the AT&T and CompuServe Frame Relay networks.  The BPX, which was produced in 1993, increased the speed and sophistication of the Frame Relay offering.  It also supported the 53 byte cells of the ATM standard instead the IPX's 24 byte cells. The original IPX product was also enhanced and re-introduced as the IGX.

The IPX product
The cards in the original IPX system were:
  The PCC — The Processor Control Card — a Motorola 68000 based shelf control card
  The VDP — The Voice Data Processor — Implemented a VAD algorithm and packetized the voice
  The VCD — The Voice Compressor-Decompressor — Implemented ADPCM
  The TXR — The Transmit Receive Card — Implemented a T1 interface with packet queues
  The PIC — The Protection Interface Card — Allowed the T1 interfaces to be swapped

The cards in the second wave were
  The SDP — The Synchronous Data Processor — added V.35, RS-422, and RS-232 data to the IPX  (this card was a very early use of Xilinx FPGAs & StrataCom was their largest customer for a time)
  The CDP — The Circuit Data Processor — Added E1 and integrated echo cancellation

The card in the third wave was
  The FRP — The Frame Relay Processor — Added Frame Relay to the IPX (implemented the SAR function in Motorola 56000 DSP's)

StrataCom management and locations
StrataCom's first CEO was Steve Campbell who later went to Packeteer.  Dick Moley, who came from ROLM Corporation, served as its CEO for most of its existence. Dave Sant originally led sales, hiring Scott Kriens who later became CEO of Juniper Networks. Bill Stensrud was the founding Vice President of Marketing (and later became a managing partner of venture capital firm Enterprise Partners). The company was located in Cupertino on Bubb Rd., Campbell on Winchester near Hacienda, and San Jose at Meridian and Parkmoor.  The company also had a manufacturing building in south San Jose built for it in 1996; this building was selected in 2006 by Nanosolar as the site of a large solar cell factory.

StrataCom went public in the fall of 1992 under the ticker symbol STRM.  Three of its executives later formed SToRM Ventures. They were Tae HeaNahm, Ryan Floyd and Sanjay Subhedar

Acquisition by Cisco Systems
Cisco Systems acquired StrataCom in 1996 for US$4 billion.  The acquired employees formed the core of Cisco's Multi-Service Switching Business Unit and helped to move Cisco more into the carrier equipment space.

References

External links
Transcript of a 2000 keynote address by Paul Baran describing the development of the IPX/PacketDAX
 Cisco acquisition
 Mention of StrataCom in article about Nanosolar's manufacturing plant

1996 mergers and acquisitions
Defunct networking companies
Cisco Systems acquisitions
Computer companies established in 1986
Computer companies disestablished in 1996
Defunct computer companies of the United States
Companies based in Santa Clara County, California
1986 establishments in California
1996 disestablishments in California